The Rosenberg's monitor (Varanus rosenbergi) is an Australian species of varanid reptile found in southern regions of the continent. They are large and fast predators with rugged bodies and long tails, having a combined length up to 1.5 metres, that will consume any smaller animal that is pursued and captured or found while foraging.
They occur in the Australian Capital Territory, New South Wales, South Australia, Victoria, where it may be rare or locally common, and more frequently observed in Western Australia, where it is sometimes abundant.

Taxonomy
The species was first described by German herpetologist Robert Mertens in 1957, named and recognized as a subspecies of Varanus gouldii; a revision of Western Australian monitors published in 1980 elevated the taxon to species status. It is now considered to be a member of the V. gouldii species complex. The holotype was collected at the Stirling Range in Southwest Australia.
The specific name, rosenbergi, is in honor of German naturalist Hermann von Rosenberg.

The infrageneric classification of the species allies it to other taxa of the subgenus Varanus (Varanus).
A geographically remote population in the eastern states has distinct characteristics that may represent a cryptic species.
A description published as Pantherosaurus kuringai in 1985 is regarded as a synonym for this species.

The common names include the heath monitor or the southern heath monitor, along with those names that are a legacy of their description as the sand goanna Varanus gouldii.

Description

Like most other monitor lizards, these are fast-moving predators with long tails, stout limbs and clawed feet.  They resemble the closely related and widespread sand goanna Varanus gouldii, to which they were previously allied as a subspecies, but distinguished by darker coloration overall, especially the markings at the tail tip and underside and the distinct black banding at the back and neck.
Dull and vaguely defined yellow stripes appear across most of the tail's length, sometimes interrupting the blackish colour of its end.
The feet and limbs are also very dark, and spotted with a creamy or brownish colour. The dark tone at the head is marked with yellow dots above the mouth, and the yellowish cream background colour of the underside displays a blackish reticular pattern.

The largest specimens are those found at Kangaroo Island, near the coast of South Australia, these are also darker than those on the mainland and possess a greater number of scale rows at the ventral side.
Fat layers in V. rosenbergi constitute around 7.6% of body weight, allowing energy reserves to be stored throughout the body and tail.
This monitor can reach a length of 1.5 metres. It is dark gray with yellow and white spotting and black bands on its body and all the way down the tail. The juvenile is tinged with orange.

The comparative ratio of head and body lengths between the sexes, often evident in the monitor subgenus Odatria, is not easily discernible in this species and their subgenus Varanus.

Behaviour
Reproductive behaviour, including guarding of nest sites, extends over a four-month period of a sexually active adult's year. Rosenberg's monitors mate over a 12-day period in January. In February and March, the female digs into an active termite mound, creating a spherical nest chamber beneath the hardened shell—found under the loose outer layer of the mound—by collapsing the internal structure of tunnels and chambers. The depth of the monitor's nest is around 700 millimetres, taking the parent several days to complete, the thickness of the termitarium's cemented shell is approximately 140 mm and the overlying friable surface 100 mm. The species lays a brood of up to 14 eggs, then redeposits the excavated material to cover her entry; the termites reform the shell of their mound over the course of several days.

Incubation periods of V. rosenbergi broods are around seven months, or longer at Kangaroo Island, which is regarded as an extended period when compared to other squamates and may be a response to the cooler climate of its range. 
In September and October, the hatchlings emerge from the mound, possibly with digging assistance from the adult; this parenting behaviour has inferred from the habits of other monitors without being directly observed in V. rosenbergi. A study observing this species at Kangaroo Island found that hatchlings emerged at the point of the parents entry to the nest, and able to excavate themselves from their birthplace. Their emergence corresponds with increasing warmth of the temperature outside the termitaria, and the hatchlings are observed at basking in the sunshine at the exterior and reoccupying the nest site during cold nights.

They are highly active carnivores, able to pursue large prey, and opportunistic generalists whose diet includes birds, reptiles, mammals, eggs, and carrion.
Analysis of the island population in South Australia revealed third of their diet is invertebrates, primarily species of Acrididae, Areneidae, Blattoidea and Coleoptera, with mammals and reptiles combined being the greater portion of animals that were eaten. Some amphibians, mostly Limnodynastes species of frogs, and a small proportion if birds were also found to have been captured and consumed, but invertebrates would be found during its regular foraging activities through soft soils and detritus.
This goanna has been observed eating road kill, including possums and wallabies, and consumption of these may account for a significant proportion of the mammal component of their diet. The native rat species Rattus fuscipes is likely pursued and caught, but the recorded consumption of Macropus fuliginosus, the western grey kangaroo, and brush-tail possum Trichosurus vulpecula is likely the discovery of their carcasses.

Water is obtained from prey when seasonal rainfall is low, and supplemented by drinking free water when available. Living in a sometimes saline environment, they are able to expel excess salts—primarily sodium chloride and a smaller amount of potassium—through gland structures at the nostrils. In winter months the water required by the goanna may be supplemented from free water or by pulmocutaneous exchange of moisture.
 
The darker coloration of V. rosenbergi, a form of melanism, allows a greater degree of thermoregulation of their body in the cooler southern climates. They periodically bask in the sun throughout the day, or when the opportunity arises, laying in the soil if it is warm or clambering on to branches to avoid a net heat loss; heath monitors are mostly found in their burrows during the coldest parts of the year.
Females may continue to be active at night, maintaining a body temperature 20 °C greater than the ambient temperature.

Varanus rosenbergi conserves its energy requirements during cooler seasons of the year, entering a state of torpor, but demonstrates the ability to voluntarily arouse itself during these periods.

The species will climb a tree to evade capture.

Distribution
The distribution range of the species is in the south of the Australian continent, all occurrences are recorded below the southern 30° line of latitude. The range in Southwest Australia is south of Mussel Pool, to the northeast of the state's capital Perth, and inland from the southern coast in a range that extends close to Bendering, Norseman, Balladonia and then east to Eucla and South Australia. Varanus rosenbergi is most common in the west, locally abundant in favourable habitat, and deeply fragmented in the east; isolated groups near Canberra and Sydney may represent a separate species. A subpopulation, with individuals somewhat larger in size, is found on Kangaroo Island, and a mainland population in South Australia is considered rare. The eastern states included in records of the species occurrence at New South Wales, the Australian Capital Territory and Victoria.

The heath monitor is found in habitat close to sea level and at elevations below 1500 metres asl.
The population in New South Wales, isolated and suspected to be a sister species, is found at high elevations that include occurrences above the snow-line in the mountainous regions of eastern Australia.
The individual range of V. rosenbergi is comparatively large.

The distribution range overlaps with Varanus gouldii and individuals of these species are sometimes sympatric, especially at southern areas of the Western Australian wheatbelt and on the Swan Coastal Plain; the species do not hybridize.
The named distribution range of the widespread population of V. gouldi, due to a historically uncertain taxonomic description, was revised to exclude the southern coastal areas were this species occurs.

Ecology
The favoured types of habitat Varanus rosenbergi is associated with plant communities are most often sandy heathland, open woodland or sclerophyll forest, although the species is known to occur in other vegetation types. 
The near coastal areas it inhabits are frequently saline environments. Subalpine environments in the southernmost parts of its range such as Naas Valley, ACT, sometimes encounters snowfall. 
Heath monitors excavate burrows for refuge, or occupy rocky fissures and hollow trees.

Reproduction
The reproductive habits of Varanus rosenbergi are closely associated with termite constructions, the above ground nest-mounds of some species, and is thought to rely on these to produce offspring.
The use of termitaria provides the newly hatched progeny the favourable conditions within the nest, warmth and regulated humidity, when conditions outside retard the activity of adults.
Several other monitor species adopt termitaria as nest sites, those utilized by V. rosenbergi offer regular internal temperatures for most of the year, usually around 30° Celsius, and do not fall below 20 °C at the coolest times of the year.

Parasites
Varanus rosenbergi is known to be host to nine species of intestinal nematodes, parasites known as roundworm, and is recorded near undisturbed habitat with high infection rates of Abbreviata, physalopteroid species of the Spirurida order.
Individuals often carry blood-feeding ticks lodged to their skin, these are found around the cloaca or base of the tail or seeking areas of high blood flow at the head and neck by the female tick when pregnant. The infestation rate in the southwest region is around half of the adults and is absent in juveniles, the Kangaroo Island population has a higher rate, around 85% of those surveyed carrying the species Aponomma fimbriatum.

References

External links
Varanus rosenbergi. The Reptile Database.

Further reading
 King, R. A., et al. Varanoid Lizards of the World. Bloomington: Indiana University Press. 2007. pg. 225–29. .
 King, D. & B. Green. Goannas: The Biology of Varanid Lizards. University of New South Wales Press. 1999. 
 Rismiller, P., et al. (2007). Life history studies of Rosenberg's goanna (Varanus rosenbergi) on Kangaroo Island, South Australia. Biawak 1(1): 42–43.

Varanus
Endemic fauna of Australia
Monitor lizards of Australia
Reptiles described in 1957
Taxa named by Robert Mertens